Vlahov is a surname. Notable people with the surname include:

Andrew Vlahov (born 1969), Australian basketball player
Dimitar Vlahov (1878–1953), Bulgarian politician
Len Vlahov (1940–1997), Australian athlete

Bulgarian-language surnames
Croatian surnames